The Fatu Hiva monarch (Pomarea whitneyi) is a large flycatcher in the family Monarchidae. It is endemic to Fatu Hiva in the Marquesas Islands, French Polynesia.  It lives in the native dense forest at elevations up to 2300 feet.  Adults are a glossy purplish-black with plush-like feathers on their foreheads and grow to around 7 ½ inches.

Taxonomy and systematics
The binomial name commemorates the US philanthropist Harry Payne Whitney. Alternate names include the Fatu Hiva flycatcher, large flycatcher and large monarch.

Status
The Fatu Hiva monarch is assessed as critically endangered, following a decline in excess of 90% over 21 years (three generations). The population is now thought to be as small as 50 birds, which equates to just 33 mature individuals. This decline is primarily attributed to the introduction of black rats, which were first observed in February 2000 and strongly correlates with the decline and near extinction of the Fatu Hiva monarch. The population decline is also due to feral cats.  Recent predator control has happened on Fatu Hiva, though it reduced the rate of territory loss from 60% in 2007–2009 to 30% in 2009–2011.

References

External links
 BirdLife Species Factsheet

Fatu Hiva monarch
Birds of the Marquesas Islands
Critically endangered fauna of Oceania
Fatu Hiva monarch
Fatu Hiva monarch
Endemic birds of French Polynesia